Scaccia is an Italian surname. Notable people with the surname include:

Angelo Maria Scaccia ( 1690–1761), Italian composer and violinist
Fabrizio Scaccia (born 1984), American football player
Mario Scaccia (1919–2011), Italian actor and writer
Mike Scaccia (1965–2012), American musician

Italian-language surnames